The 2023 ARCA Menards Series is the 71st season of the ARCA Menards Series, a stock car racing series sanctioned by NASCAR in the United States. The season began at Daytona International Speedway with the BRANDT 200 on February 18 and will end with the Shore Lunch 200 at Toledo Speedway on October 7.

Nick Sanchez, the 2022 series champion, will run full-time for Rev Racing in the NASCAR Craftsman Truck Series in 2023 and therefore will not return to run full-time in the ARCA Menards Series and defend his title.

Teams and drivers

Complete schedule

Limited schedule

Notes

Changes

Teams
 On August 4, 2022, it was announced that 3F Racing, a team from Germany, would make their debut in the ARCA Menards Series and NASCAR Truck Series with Christopher Tate driving for the team in those series as well as the NASCAR Cup Series with a yet to be determined driver. On October 17, Tate announced a sponsor for his ARCA starts, effectively announcing that he would make his debut in 2023.
 On September 5, 2022, it was revealed that Hendren Motorsports would not be back in 2023 as car owner Bill Hendren retired after the 2022 season. The team fielded the No. 24 car in the two dirt races for Ryan Unzicker for several years.
 On September 12, 2022, Dale Shearer revealed on his website that his team would be back in ARCA for the first time since 2019. Shearer has previously used the No. 73 but Andy Jankowiak's team took that number during Shearer's time away from the series so he will need to pick a different number to use in 2023.
 On October 17, 2022, Mandy Chick announced on the SRWRadio Podcast that she would run full-time for her family team, Team Chick Motorsports, in the main ARCA Series in 2023. It will be the team's first time running the full season in the main ARCA Series.
 On December 9, 2022, it was announced that the No. 18 car would go back to being owned by Joe Gibbs Racing in 2023. It was owned by Kyle Busch Motorsports in 2022.
 On December 12, 2022, AM Racing announced that they would be fielding an ARCA car full-time in 2023. The team previously fielded the No. 32 car part-time.
 On December 19, 2022, Brad Smith tweeted that he would be expanding his team to two full-time cars and the number of his second car would be the No. 26, which his team previously used from 1998 to 2012. The driver(s) of the No. 26 car have yet to be announced.
 On January 6, 2023, GMS Racing announced that they would be closing down their ARCA team in 2023 after the team's expansion to their Truck Series team. Daniel Dye, who drove full-time for GMS in the main ARCA Series in 2022, is moving up to the Truck Series full-time in 2023 driving for GMS.
 On January 8, 2023, it was announced that Tim Goulet Enterprises would rename to Rise Motorsports in 2023. On February 13, 2023, the team announced that Rita Goulet (nee Thomason) would run the full season in the East Series, which includes the main ARCA/East Series combination races. The team had announced on January 8 that Stephen Leicht would drive for them in the combination race at Bristol so the team will likely field two cars in that race for both drivers. It would be the team's first time fielding a second car.

Drivers
 On May 8, 2022, it was announced that Steve Austin would drive full-time for T.C. Enterprises in 2023, but his arrest on May 22 may result in these plans falling through. (He was never officially suspended by ARCA or a public statement from ARCA announcing his suspension was never released.)
 On August 3, 2022, Rita Thomason revealed on the ARCA Reddit page that she would return to Tim Goulet Enterprises in 2023. On January 8, 2023, it was announced that TGE would rename to Rise Motorsports in 2023 and continue to field the No. 31 car in the main ARCA Series and the East Series for Rita, whose last name is now Goulet after she married the team's owner Tim Goulet over the offseason, and Stephen Leicht. On February 13, it was announced that Rita Goulet would run the full East Series season with Rita in 2023. She and Leicht are both scheduled to run the main ARCA/East Series combination race at Bristol so the team will likely field two cars in that race.
 On August 4, 2022, it was announced that Christopher Tate would make his ARCA debut for the new 3F Racing team. On October 17, Tate announced a sponsor for his ARCA starts, effectively announcing that he would make his debut in 2023.
 On August 12, 2022, it was announced that Toni Breidinger would drive in the Toyota Gazoo Racing North America GR Cup in 2023. The series is only 14 races on 7 weekends so depending on the schedule, she could still return to ARCA full-time and if not, part-time.
 On October 6, 2022, during Corey LaJoie's kickball tournament, the broadcasters on NASCAR's YouTube livestream mentioned during the top of the fifth inning that actor Frankie Muniz could run at least part-time in ARCA in 2023. He tested an ARCA car for Fast Track Racing in the test session at Daytona in January 2022. On January 5, 2023, ThePitLane reported that Muniz could drive full-time for Rette Jones Racing in 2023. On January 11, RJR officially announced that Muniz would drive their No. 30 car full-time in the main ARCA Series in 2023, replacing Amber Balcaen, who moved to Venturini Motorsports to drive their No. 15 car part-time in 2023.
 On October 10, 2022, NASCAR Whelen Euro Series driver Thomas Krasonis announced that he would make his ARCA debut in 2023. The team he will drive for has yet to be announced. He would be the first driver from Greece to compete in the series.
 On October 17, 2022, Mandy Chick announced on the SRWRadio Podcast that she would run full-time for her family team, Team Chick Motorsports, in the main ARCA Series in 2023.
 On October 21, 2022, Logan Misuraca announced that she would run part-time starting at the season-opener at Daytona with hopes to run a full season with sponsorship from 1inamillion.life, a company she founded. On November 1, she revealed to Forbes that she would be driving for Ben Kennedy Racing.
 On October 25, 2022, Jon Garrett announced that he would run full-time for Fast Track Racing in 2023, likely in the No. 10 car. He drove for the team part-time in 2022.
 On October 27, 2022, Mark Kristl from Frontstretch stated on the ARCA Reddit page that he anticipated that David Gilliland Racing would field at least a part-time ARCA car again in 2023 after the team's name change to TRICON Garage and that Rev Racing intends to return to ARCA with their 2023 driver lineup being determined after their Drive for Diversity combine event. Nick Sanchez is moving up to the Truck Series full-time in 2023 with Rev Racing and Rajah Caruth is moving up to the Truck Series full-time in 2023 driving for GMS Racing. On January 13, 2023, Rev announced that Andrés Pérez de Lara would drive the No. 2 car full-time in 2023 except for the season-opener at Daytona as he would still be 17 years old and ineligible to race there. Lavar Scott was also announced to run the full season in the East Series for the team in 2023 (which includes 4 combination races with the main ARCA Series) and he would also replace Pérez de Lara in the No. 2 car at Daytona as he is 18 and old enough to race at the track.
 On November 14, 2022, an ARCA Reddit user posted that Bobby Gerhart Racing had posted on RacingJunk.com that their No. 5 car is open for the season-opener at Daytona for a driver that brings sponsorship. The driver has yet to be determined. BGR did not end up attempting the season-opener at Daytona.
 On November 15, 2022, The Daily Reporter (Coldwater) reported that Gage Rodgers would like to run the 2023 season-opener at Daytona for Kimmel Racing and will test with the team at Daytona in January.
 On December 2, 2022, Clubb Racing Inc. announced that Brayton Laster, Casey Carden and team owner Alex Clubb will share the No. 03 car full-time. All three drivers also drove the car in 2022.
 On December 6, 2022, it was announced that Zachary Tinkle, who ran the full season in the main ARCA Series aside from the race at Mid-Ohio, would run full-time in the East Series in the No. 11 car for Fast Track Racing in 2023. Fast Track was one of the teams he drove part-time for in 2022.
 On December 9, 2022, it was announced that William Sawalich would drive the No. 18 car part-time in 2023 and the car would go back to being owned by Joe Gibbs Racing. It was owned by Kyle Busch Motorsports in 2022.

Crew chiefs
 On January 4, 2023, Costner Weaver Motorsports announced that the crew chief of their No. 93 car would be Darrell Phillips, who was the crew chief for Tim Richmond's No. 27 car in 2022.

Manufacturers
 On December 12, 2022, AM Racing announced that they would be switching from Chevrolet to Ford in 2023.

Sponsorship
 On October 17, 2022, it was announced that T Top Manufacturing would sponsor Christopher Tate in his ARCA starts for 3F Racing in 2023.
 On October 21, 2022, it was revealed that 1inamillion.life, a program created by driver Logan Misuraca to spread awareness about mental health, would sponsor her in her ARCA starts in 2023.

Schedule
Some tracks announced their 2022 race dates before the release of the entire schedule on November 11, 2022.

Notes:
 The race at Phoenix in March is a combination race with the ARCA Menards Series West (highlighted in gold).
 The races at Iowa, IRP, Milwaukee and Bristol are combination races with the ARCA Menards Series East (highlighted in silver).

After previously only broadcasting about half of the main ARCA Series races for several years, usually only the races that are on the same weekend at the same track as a NASCAR Cup, Xfinity and/or Truck race, Fox will broadcast all 20 main ARCA Series races in 2023.

Results and standings

Race results

Drivers' championship

Notes: 
 The pole winner also receives 1 bonus point, similar to the previous ARCA points system used until 2019 and unlike NASCAR. 
 Additionally, after groups of 5 races of the season, drivers that compete in all 5 races receive 50 additional points. These points bonuses will be given after the races at Charlotte, Pocono, Milwaukee and Toledo.

(key) Bold – Pole position awarded by time. Italics – Pole position set by final practice results or rainout. * – Most laps led. ** – All laps led.

See also
 2023 NASCAR Cup Series
 2023 NASCAR Xfinity Series
 2023 NASCAR Craftsman Truck Series
 2023 ARCA Menards Series East
 2023 ARCA Menards Series West
 2023 NASCAR Pinty's Series
 2023 NASCAR Whelen Euro Series
 2023 SRX Series

References

ARCA Menards Series
ARCA Menards Series seasons
ARCA Menards Series
ARCA Menards Series
ARCA Menards Series